The MP-APVL 83-F4 is a Chilean anti-tank blast mine based on the United States M1A1 mine. The mine has a plastic body with distinctive pressed steel pressure spider on the top. The main charge of the mine has 3.5 kg of steel balls embedded into the charge. The steel balls in the main charge create a secondary anti-personnel effect.

The mine is in service with Chile.

Specifications
 Weight: 6.75 kg
 Explosive content: 2 kg of TNT and 0.2 kg Pentolite
 Operating pressure: 120 kg to 250 kg

References
 Jane's Mines and Mine Clearance 2005-2006
 

Anti-tank mines